George Cotton (21 May 1743 – 10 December 1805) was an English Anglican priest, most notably Dean of Chester  from 1787 until his death.

Cholmondeley was born at Combermere in Cheshire and was educated at Westminster and Trinity College, Cambridge. He held livings at South Reston, Stowe, Stoke-upon-Trent and Davenham. He died at Bath. His grandson was Bishop of Calcutta from 1858 until 1866.

Notes

1743 births
1805 deaths
18th-century English Anglican priests
19th-century English Anglican priests
Deans of Chester
People educated at Westminster School, London
Alumni of Trinity College, Cambridge
People from Cheshire